"Hot Shit" is a song by American rappers Cardi B, Kanye West, and Lil Durk. It was released on July 1, 2022, by Atlantic Records as the third single for Cardi B's upcoming second studio album. The song was produced by Tay Keith and BanBwoi.

Background 
"Hot Shit" was first announced during a commercial that occurred during the BET Awards 2022. In an interview with Zane Lowe, Cardi B remarked that the song was "older than 'WAP'", with the original demo dating back to 2019.

On June 26, 2022, Cardi B released a preview for the song on Twitter, adding that she had "another surprise" for her fans to be revealed the next day. The surprise was the cover art for "Hot Shit", as well as the announcement of the song's features, Kanye West and Lil Durk. On the song's cover art, Cardi B pays homage to rapper Lil' Kim.

Composition 
Cardi B's verse in "Hot Shit" includes references to the wrestler Jimmy Snuka. Daily Beast described the song as "manly". The song also contains a sample from Marcia Griffiths's 1983 track "Electric Boogie".

Music video 

The official music video was directed by Lado Kvataniya. It was released on July 13, 2022.

Awards

Charts

Weekly charts

Year-end charts

References 

2022 songs
2022 singles
Cardi B songs
Kanye West songs
Lil Durk songs
Songs written by Cardi B
Songs written by Kanye West
Songs written by Lil Durk
Songs written by Tay Keith
Song recordings produced by Tay Keith
Atlantic Records singles